Charles Riley was an Australian politician.

He was a barrister who was called to the bar in 1852. He resided on the North Shore. He was a member of the New South Wales Legislative Council from 1856 until his resignation in 1858. While in parliament, he was involved in a public stoush with William Forster over media reports regarding comments allegedly made in parliament.

References

Year of birth unknown
Year of death missing
Members of the New South Wales Legislative Council